Acidovorax cattleyae is a bacterium from the family Comamonadaceae which causes brown spots on orchids.

References

External links
Type strain of Acidovorax cattleyae at BacDive -  the Bacterial Diversity Metadatabase

Comamonadaceae
Bacteria described in 1911